''For the military use of the facility prior to April 1975, see Chu Lai Air Base

Chu Lai Airport  is an airport in Chu Lai, Vietnam. It is near Tam Kỳ city, the largest city in Quảng Nam province. The airport is located in the Chu Lai Open Economic Zone, Núi Thành District.

The airfield was originally established in the Vietnam War, as Chu Lai Air Base, by the United States Marines. The airport was nearly abandoned after the fall of Saigon, and only used irregularly for military flights. On March 22, 2004, the construction of the terminal began and on March 22, 2005, the first commercial flight from Ho Chi Minh City's Tan Son Nhat International Airport landed here.

As of 2008, Chu Lai Airport is the largest airfield in Vietnam in terms of area, covering 30 km2. The runway is 3050 m long.

To facilitate the travel arrangement to two major towns in the neighborhoods, free shuttle bus services are provided from and to the airport for Tam Kỳ city and Quảng Ngãi city.

Renovation
The government of Vietnam has approved an investment plan for this airport. According to this plan, Chu Lai airport will receive nearly VND 11,470 billion (nearly $700 million) in investment for enlarging its capacity to 25 landing places by 2015 and 46 by 2025. The project will include renovation and new infrastructure, including two runways, 3,800m and 4,000m long, and 60 meters wide each, six parking lots and two transit stations.
By 2010, existing runways and parking lots will be upgraded. The airport will also receive a new signal light system and control station for medium sized aircraft, such as Boeing 767s and Airbus A320s. Vietnamese officials hope the airport will be able to handle 4 million passengers by completion in 2025.
The airport is projected to become an air cargo transport hub, with 5 million metric tons of cargo per year.

In November 2015, a collaboration between Vietnam and New Zealand governments has initiated a project to establish a pilot training school in the Chu Lai Airport. This is projected to train 300 pilots a year in 2020.

Airlines and destinations

References

Tam Ky
Buildings and structures in Quảng Nam province
Airports in Vietnam
2005 establishments in Vietnam
Airports established in 2005